Martín Landajo (born June 14, 1988 in Buenos Aires) is an Argentine rugby union player. He plays as a scrumhalf.
He currently plays for national Argentina team and USA Perpignan. He played for Pampas XV.

He has 27 caps for national Argentina team, since 2008, with 5 tries scored, 25 points on aggregate.
He was part of the Argentina squad that competed in the Rugby Championship 2012, 2013, 2014  and 2015.

Landajo was part of the national team that competed at the 2015 Rugby World Cup.

In 2019 he joined English club Harlequins. He was a replacement in the Premiership final against Exeter on 26 June 2021 as Harlequins won the game 40-38 in the highest scoring Premiership final ever.

On 19 June 2021, Landajo travels to France to join Perpignan in the Top 14 competition ahead of the 2021-22 season.

References

External links
 Jaguares Profile

1988 births
Living people
Rugby union players from Buenos Aires
Argentine rugby union players
Argentina international rugby union players
Rugby union scrum-halves
Club Atlético San Isidro rugby union players
Jaguares (Super Rugby) players
Pampas XV players
Harlequin F.C. players
USA Perpignan players
American Raptors players